Cheshmeh Sorkh-e Qabr-e Baba (also Romanized as Cheshmeh Sorkh-e Qabr-e Bābā; also known as Cheshmeh Sorkh) is a village in Jalalvand Rural District, Firuzabad District, Kermanshah County, Kermanshah Province, Iran. At the 2006 census, its population was 83, in 14 families.

References 

Populated places in Kermanshah County